A legal document assistant (LDA, also known as "document technician," "legal document preparer," "legal technician," "online legal document provider" or "legal document clerk") in the United States is a non-lawyer who is authorized to assist with the preparation of legal instruments. Unlike a paralegal, legal document assistants do not work under the supervision of an attorney.

The prevalence of LDAs is an American phenomenon created in response to the more strict licensing laws for attorneys elsewhere in the world. The job was created by using the doctrine of pro se to enable someone to help another prepare a legal document. In all U.S. states except for Louisiana and Puerto Rico, only an attorney can advise and draft a legal document for another party. With the self-help pro se concept and stock legal forms, the Legal Document Preparer profession was born.

The role of a Legal Document Assistant varies significantly across legal jurisdictions, and therefore can be treated here in only the most general terms. Some acts performed by Legal Document Assistants may be lawful in one jurisdiction and prohibited in other jurisdictions.

History 

Many LDAs view their professional history as descending directly from that of the scribe or scrivener. The terms "legal scrivener" and "independent paralegal" were commonly used in the US from the late 1970s until 1994. In that year, the Bankruptcy Reform Act was signed into law by President Bill Clinton. Among other provisions, it banned the use of the word "legal" in any form, to describe the services provided by non-attorney document preparers, and also specifically created the term "bankruptcy petition preparer." This forced many US LDAs who assisted with bankruptcies to search for new terms to describe their profession.

Although California became the first state to formally regulate LDAs, the first licensing proposal was the Oregon Scrivener's Act, introduced in the Oregon legislature in 1985. In 2003, Arizona began certifying individuals and businesses who prepare documents through its "Legal Document Preparer Program". as certified legal document preparers (CLDP).

Florida 

Rosemary Furman a Florida resident had been a legal secretary for about 35 years, until she was laid off in 1976. Not finding anyone willing to hire a middle-aged legal assistant, she began offering her services as a free-lance paralegal. Within a short time, she had developed a thriving business, but not as she had originally anticipated. She anticipated lawyers needing assistance, but instead, consumers were wanting to purchase legal documents directly, to represent themselves in matters such as divorces, name changes ,and guardianship proceedings. When Furman was charged by the Florida Supreme Court in 1977 for "unauthorized practice of law," she became somewhat of a national cause célèbre. In the long run, however, she was unsuccessful. After having her request for review by the United States Supreme Court denied, she decided to close her business and retire, rather than be sent to jail for contempt.

Furman’s misconduct went far beyond merely practicing law without a license. As noted by the Supreme Court of Florida, the uncontradicted testimony of her former customers was that she encouraged them to falsify information in marriage dissolution papers and to conceal relevant information. Her purported reasons were various: it’s none of their damn business, they don’t pay attention to the information, or you’ll (either) get less or give more money in the dissolution judgment. In one instance, she advised a woman to insert the date of her dissolved first marriage as the date of the second marriage; this was in the petition for dissolution. For context, she had been married, divorced, and remarried to the same husband, but could not remember the date of the remarriage. Another couple who disagreed on whether their stipulation on child support provided for $35 per week or $35 per child was advised that it did not matter because the judge awarded whatever he wanted to anyway. In a particularly egregious instance, she assisted a husband seeking a marriage dissolution in preparing a stipulation in which he agreed to child custody by the wife. While the dissolution petition and child custody stipulation were pending before the court, the husband became aware that the wife was abusing the children, took actual custody of the children, and consulted Furman about withdrawing his stipulated agreement on child custody. Furman advised him not to do so because this would require “starting over” on the dissolution petition and he should let the social agency handle the child abuse and custody problem.

Current case law in Florida has established that a non-lawyer may sell blank legal forms, type legal forms completed by hand, and sell general printed legal information. The non-lawyer cannot, however, advise a customer on how to complete a legal form, as this constitutes the practice of law.

Oregon 

At about the same time that Rosemary Furman was receding from the public eye however, another woman began gaining national prominence for her role in the self-help legal profession:  Peggy Muse. Unlike Rosemary Furman, she was not a retired legal secretary, in fact, she had never worked in a lawyer's office.  An attractive woman in her 30s (in fact, a former model), Muse had been a consumer advocate for a small community newspaper in Medford, Oregon, where she lived with her three school-age children.  When the column was canceled by the newspaper, she rented a small office space above a dress shop, and outfitted with a card table and two chairs, opened the Consumer Sounding Board (CSB); intended to be a private consumer advocacy agency, CSB soon grew into the business of preparing legal documents, as Muse discovered that one of the most common consumer complaints, related to the high cost of legal representation for relatively minor needs.

After establishing her office in Medford into a full-time storefront operation, with several employees, Muse moved to Oregon's largest city, Portland, and opened a second CSB office.  Within a few years, she began to receive national attention, as well as attention from the Oregon State Bar.  She was featured in a front-page sectional article in the Los Angeles Times, which in addition to detailing her Portland and Medford offices, also followed her in her mobile "paralegal van," as she went with an employee to set up shop in a small-town parking lot for a day, to offer her services to the residents of a rural area.  Shortly after this, and after being featured in a segment of NBC's Today Show, she began offering franchises, as well as setting up additional company-owned offices.  At its height, CSB had a total of 14 offices in 4 Western states. In 1993 however, after a 15-year legal battle, the Oregon Bar succeeded in convincing a judge in Medford to sentence Muse to jail for 20 days.  Following that experience, she divested herself of her remaining offices, and moved to California, where she remains today, having been one of the first persons licensed there as an LDA, following the 1998 licensing act.

California 

Legal Document Assistants in the State of California are still sometimes incorrectly referred to as "independent paralegals" or "freelance paralegals," even though it has been more than a decade since those terms became obsolete by law. On September 30, 1998 Governor Pete Wilson signed California State Senate Bill SB1418, regulating the legal document preparation profession in the State of California, and creating a new formal title, Legal Document Assistant (LDA).

While many LDAs have paralegal education and experience, in California they are not the same as paralegals. Under California law, a paralegal is prohibited from providing services directly to the consumer. Paralegals may only be employed by an attorney, law firm, corporation, governmental agency, or other entity; and work under the direct supervision of a licensed attorney within the scope of that employment.

Unlike paralegals, LDAs are authorized by law to provide legal document preparation services to consumers, after complying with the registration and bonding requirements. Neither paralegals nor LDAs are permitted to engage in the practice of law.

LDAs are not lawyers and do not offer legal advice, discuss legal strategies, answer questions of a legal nature, select forms for the consumer, or appear in court on the consumer’s behalf. They are professionals, qualified through education, training or work experience, authorized to assist consumers representing themselves in legal matters by preparing and processing the necessary legal documents.

A Legal Document Assistant, as defined by the California Business & Professions Code (Section 6400 (c)) is: "Any person who is otherwise not exempted and who provides, or assists in providing, or offers to provide, or offers to assist in providing, for compensation, any self-help service to a member of the public who is representing himself or herself in a legal matter, or who holds himself or herself out as someone who offers that service or has that authority, or a corporation, partnership, association, or other entity that employs or contracts with any person who is not otherwise exempted who, as part of his or her responsibilities, provides, or assists in providing, or offers to provide, or offers to assist in providing, for compensation, any self-help service to a member of the public who is representing himself or herself in a legal matter or holds himself or herself out as someone who offers that service or has that authority."

The California Association of Legal Document Assistants was established in August 1986, and was formerly known as “California Association of Independent Paralegals” (CAIP). CALDA is the time-honored organization for legal document preparation professionals and supporters of this profession. CALDA promotes and encourages high standards of ethical and professional conduct while offering its members educational opportunities, professional alliance, a website business listing, member forum exchange, and attorney approved printed brochure materials. Commitment is given to increasing public access to the legal system and CALDA recognizes the Legal Document Assistant’s professional responsibilities to the public, to the legal system, and to colleagues.

CALDA promotes growth, development, and recognition of the Legal Document Assistants’ profession as an integral partner in the delivery of legal services. Membership consists of registered and bonded California Legal Document Assistants, Bankruptcy Petition Preparers, Social Security Disability Advocates, SSI Advocates, and sustaining members who support and enhance the LDA profession.

CALDA’s Board of directors is composed of members who volunteer to help run and manage this organization: Nancy Newlin (President), Connie Crokett (Vice President), Jeannie Bruins (Chief Financial Officer), Carol Ludlow (Secretary), Robin Schumacher (Vice President of Central Valley Chapter-CALDA), Angela Grijalva (Newsletter Chair) and (President of the Capital City Chapter), Jim Wilroy (Legislative Chair) and Carlo Perez (Educational Chair).

Louisiana 

Certain types of legal documents can be drafted by a notary public in the State of Louisiana. Louisiana notaries public prepare and draft legal documents of a noncontentious nature (i.e. not for court cases) such as wills, trusts, marriage contracts, articles of incorporation, estate inventories, mortgages, real estate sales contracts, powers of attorney, etc. Aside from drafting, they are also authorized to make inventories, property descriptions, take company minutes, and appraise and convey real estate. Louisiana, along with Puerto Rico, have this exception because prior to inclusion in the United States, both were (and continue to be) under the civil law legal system. Under civil law, notaries are lawyers, which is why in Louisiana notaries are appointed for life and used to be licensed before the advent of practice of law statutes in the 1930s. Louisiana notaries public are not required to be attorneys or otherwise trained in law; however, they do have to pass an extensive exam on notarial law (i.e., the areas of law a notary can draft for - property law, estate law, family law, etc.), they must sign and witness the signing of the documents they draft (notarial acts), and register and file those documents with the local court.

Future 

As the preparation of legal documents becomes more and more computerized, the function of non-attorney document preparers has become less dependent upon the preparer's individual skills, and more upon the quality of their software.  By the same token, the continued increase of the availability of document software, legal aid websites, and the like, make it more and more likely that persons with some level of computer skills will be able to prepare and file legal documents without attorneys, and in fact, may not need even the limited assistance offered by LDAs, to prepare competent and quality legal documents.  In fact, in the late 1990s, the Texas Bar Association, recognizing the threat that this trend represents to the pocketbooks of lawyers, sued Nolo Press, the country's leading publisher of self-help books and software, for alleging that Nolo was guilty of practicing law without a license.  Although the Federal Circuit Court hearing the case initially ruled in favor of the State Bar, ultimately, they were unsuccessful, as the Texas Legislature passed a law which clearly established that selling books and software on legal subjects could not be considered practicing law. The preceding sentence exemplifies why the Texas Bar Association's concern with "quality legal documents" prepared by non-attorneys extends beyond the mere "threat that this trend represents of [sic] the pocketbooks of lawyers," since the above mentioned law - Tex. Gov't. Ann. § 81.101 provides:

 
At the very least, it appears that the statute exempts only such books and software which "clearly and conspicuously state that the products are not a substitute for the advice of an attorney." Thus, under certain facts and circumstances, it appears that such software and/or books could still constitute the unauthorized practice of law absent a disclaimer as required by the statute. For a discussion of the specific facts that led a federal court to conclude that the developer, publisher, and marketer of Quicken Family Lawyer had engaged in the unauthorized practice of law in Texas (prior to enactment of section C, above), the reader is referred to Unauthorized Practice of Law Committee v. Parsons, 1999 WL 47235 (N.D. Tex. 1999)

In New York, "quality" legal documents are available online through the state court system.

References 

11. ^Angela Grijalva, Legal Document Assistant

Legal professions
Legal documents